Louis IX (also known as Louis the Rich; 23 February 1417 – 18 January 1479) was Duke of Bavaria-Landshut from 1450. He was a son of Henry XVI the Rich and Margaret of Austria. Louis was the founder of the University of Ingolstadt (now the University of Munich).

Biography
Louis succeeded his father in 1450. He was the second of the three famous rich dukes, who reigned Bavaria-Landshut in the 15th century. Their residence was Trausnitz Castle in Landshut, a fortification which attained enormous dimensions.

Since Louis invaded the imperial free cities of Dinkelsbühl and Donauwörth in 1458 he disputed with Frederick III, Holy Roman Emperor, until peace was made in Prague in 1463. In 1462 Louis defeated his enemy Albert III, Margrave of Brandenburg, who tried to extend his influence in Franconia in the battle of Giengen.  Louis expelled all Jews who rejected baptism from his duchy.

In 1472 Louis founded the Ludwig-Maximilians-University in Ingolstadt, which was moved to Landshut in 1800 and finally to Munich. In 1475 he organized the Landshut Wedding of his son George with the princess Hedwig Jagiellon, a daughter of King Casimir IV of Poland, one of the most splendid festivals of the Middle Age.

Family and children
On 21 March 1452 Louis was married with Princess Amalia of Saxony (4 April 1436 – 19 October 1501), daughter of Frederick II, Elector of Saxony. They had four children:
 Elisabeth (c. 1453 – 1457)
 George, Duke of Bavaria (15 August 1455 – 1 December 1503)
 Margaret (7 November 1456 – 25 February 1501), married on 21 February 1474 to Philip, Elector Palatine
 Anna (c. 1462–1462)

Ancestors 

The wedding of his son George with the Polish princess Hedwig Jagiellon in 1475 was celebrated in Landshut with one of the most splendid festivals of the Middle Age.

1417 births
1479 deaths
15th-century dukes of Bavaria
People from Burghausen, Altötting
House of Wittelsbach